The 2015 Odlum Brown Vancouver Open was a professional tennis tournament played on outdoor hard courts. It was the 11th edition, for men, and 14th edition, for women, of the tournament and part of the 2015 ATP Challenger Tour and the 2015 ITF Women's Circuit, offering totals of $100,000, for men, and $100,000, for women, in prize money. It took place in West Vancouver, British Columbia, Canada between August 17 to August 23, 2015.

Men's singles main-draw entrants

Seeds

1 Rankings are as of August 10, 2015

Other entrants
The following players received wildcards into the singles main draw:
 Ernests Gulbis
 Dennis Novikov
 Alexander Sarkissian

The following players received entry from the qualifying draw:
 Guido Andreozzi
 Daniel Evans
 Maxime Hamou
 Radek Štěpánek

The following players received entry as lucky losers:
 Philip Bester
 Mathias Bourgue

Women's singles main-draw entrants

Seeds

1 Rankings are as of August 10, 2015

Other entrants
The following players received wildcards into the singles main draw:
 Samantha Crawford
 Gabriela Dabrowski
 Vania King
 Laura Robson

The following player entered the singles main draw with a protected ranking:
 Ksenia Pervak

The following players received entry from the qualifying draw:
 Julia Glushko
 Anett Kontaveit
 Kateryna Kozlova
 Zhang Shuai

The following player received entry as a lucky loser:
 Sharon Fichman

Champions

Men's singles

 Dudi Sela def.  John-Patrick Smith, 6–4, 7–5

Women's singles

 Johanna Konta def.  Kirsten Flipkens, 6–2, 6–4

Men's doubles

 Treat Huey /  Frederik Nielsen def.  Yuki Bhambri /  Michael Venus, 7–6(7–4), 6–7(3–7), [10–5]

Women's doubles

 Johanna Konta /  Maria Sanchez def.  Raluca Olaru /  Anna Tatishvili, 7–6(7–5), 6–4

External links
Official website

Odlum Brown Vancouver Open
Odlum Brown Vancouver Open
Vancouver Open
Odlum Brown Vancouver Open